The 2001 UCI Mountain Bike & Trials World Championships were held in Vail, Colorado, United States from 12 to 16 September 2001. The disciplines included were cross-country, downhill, dual, and trials.

The event was the 12th edition of the UCI Mountain Bike World Championships and the 16th edition of the UCI Trials World Championships. It was the second time the UCI Mountain Bike World Championships had been held in Vail, the first having been in 1994. It was also the third time the championships had been held in Colorado, as the inaugural UCI Mountain Bike World Championships had been held in Durango in 1990.

Medal summary

Men's events

Women's events

Team events

Medal table

See also
2001 UCI Mountain Bike World Cup
UCI Mountain Bike Marathon World Championships

References

External links
 Results for the mountain-bike events on cyclingnews.com
 Results for the trials events on uci.ch

UCI Mountain Bike World Championships
International cycle races hosted by the United States
UCI Mountain Bike and Trials World Championships
Mountain biking events in the United States